The Oceania Rugby Women's Sevens Championship is the regional championship for women's international rugby sevens in Oceania. The tournament is held over two days, typically on a weekend. It is sanctioned and sponsored by Oceania Rugby, which is the rugby union governing body for the region.

The first official regional 7s championship for international women's teams from Oceania was the Pacific tournament held in Port Moresby in 2007. This was followed by the Oceania Championship in 2008.

The Oceania Rugby Women's Sevens serves as a qualification tournament for the following:

 World Rugby Sevens Challenger Series
 Rugby World Cup Sevens
 Olympic Games
 Commonwealth Games

Tournaments Summary

Results by year

2007 Pacific Tournament
Played 1 and 2 December at Port Moresby, PNG (source IRB)
Fiji 40-0 Niue
Samoa 17-17 Papua New Guinea
Fiji 46-0 Papua New Guinea
Samoa 29-0 Niue
Fiji 26-7 Samoa
Niue vs Papua New Guinea

Classification Stages
Plate Final
Papua New Guinea 38-0 Niue
Final
Fiji 31-5 Samoa

2014

Coral Coast Sevens 
The fifth edition of the tournament was held on 13–15 November 2014 at Sigatoka, Lawaqa Park, (Fiji). 12 women's teams and 24 men's teams were invited to compete for a total prize pool of $75,000.

International matches:
PNG 34-7 New Caledonia
Australia 36-5 New Caledonia

New Caledonia lost in Bowl final; PNG won the Plate final; Fiji lose Vs Serevi Selects (mainly USA) in Cup semi-finals; Australia won Cup final 19-7 Vs Serevi Selects.

See also 
 Oceania Rugby Men's Sevens Championship

References

External links
 Oceania Rugby official website

 
Women's rugby sevens competitions
Oceania Rugby Sevens Championship
Women's rugby union competitions in Oceania for national teams
Rugby sevens competitions in Oceania
Recurring sporting events established in 2007